Márcio Artur de Matos (born March 29, 1946, in Mineiros do Tietê, São Paulo) is a Brazilian politician, current mayor of Telêmaco Borba, municipality in the state of Paraná in the Southern Region of Brazil.

He is a physician trained at the Federal University of São Paulo. He is from the Democratic Labour Party (PDT). He was alderman and federal deputy.

References

1946 births
Living people
20th-century Brazilian physicians
Members of the Chamber of Deputies (Brazil) from Paraná
Democratic Labour Party (Brazil) politicians
Brazilian Labour Party (current) politicians
Workers' Party (Brazil) politicians
Brazilian Democratic Movement politicians
Mayors of places in Brazil
People from Telêmaco Borba
People from São Paulo (state)
Federal University of São Paulo alumni